The women's 1500 m  at the 2010 KNSB Dutch Single Distance Championships in Heerenveen took place at Thialf on 1 November 2009. The top five speed skaters qualified for the 1500 m at the 2009–10 ISU Speed Skating World Cup. Paulien van Deutekom was the title holder.

Results

Final results 

<small>Notes:
PR = personal recordDNS = did not start

Source: KNSB.nl

Draw 

Source: KNSB.nl

References 

Dutch Single Distance Championships
Single Distance Championships
2010 Single Distance
World